Luka Goginava is a Georgian rugby union player. He plays as Loosehead Prop for Racing 92 in Top 14.

References

1996 births
Living people
Rugby union players from Georgia (country)
Racing 92 players
Rugby union props
CA Brive players
Expatriate sportspeople from Georgia (country) in France
Expatriate rugby union players from Georgia (country)
Expatriate rugby union players in France
FC Grenoble players
Soyaux Angoulême XV Charente players